Anticipation is the second studio album by pianist Josh Nelson. It was released in 2004.

Track listing

Personnel
 Josh Nelson - Piano, Fender Rhodes (on track 4)
 Benjamin Campbell - Bass
 Matt Slocum - Drums
 Steve Cotter - Guitar (on tracks 2 & 4)
 Sara Gazarek - Vocals (on track 4)
 Ludvig Girdland - Violin (on track 4)
 Dayna Stephens - Tenor Saxophone (on tracks 6 & 8)

References

Josh Nelson albums
2004 albums
Instrumental albums